Wahlsten is an unincorporated community in Kugler Township, Saint Louis County, Minnesota, United States.

Geography
The community is located five miles south of Tower at the intersection of State Highway 135 (MN 135) and Saint Louis County Road 26 (Wahlsten Road). Wahlsten is located 17 miles north of Aurora. State Highway 169 (MN 169) and the Pike River are nearby.  The community of Embarrass is also in the area.

History
The community was named for August Wahlsten, a Swedish settler.

References

 Official State of Minnesota Highway Map – 2011/2012 edition

Unincorporated communities in Minnesota
Unincorporated communities in St. Louis County, Minnesota